Drew Coverdale (born 20 September 1969) is an English former footballer who made 30 appearances in the Football League playing as a full back for Darlington in the 1990s. He began his career with Middlesbrough, without representing them in the League, and went on to play non-league football for clubs including Boston United and Billingham Synthonia. He was a member of the Darlington team that won the 1989–90 Football Conference title and consequent promotion to the Football League Fourth Division.

At the age of 24, Coverdale gave up full-time football to qualify as a physiotherapist. He went on to work in the NHS and in private practice.

References

1969 births
Living people
People from Norton, County Durham
Footballers from County Durham
English footballers
Association football defenders
Middlesbrough F.C. players
Darlington F.C. players
Boston United F.C. players
Billingham Synthonia F.C. players
National League (English football) players
English Football League players
Sportspeople from Yorkshire